Rene Alexander Acosta (born January 16, 1969) is an American attorney and politician, who served as the 27th United States Secretary of Labor from 2017 to 2019.

A member of the Republican Party, he was appointed by President George W. Bush to the National Labor Relations Board, and later served as the assistant attorney general for civil rights and the U.S. attorney for the Southern District of Florida. He is a former dean of Florida International University College of Law. He has twice been named on the ‘50 most important Hispanics’ list by Hispanic Business Magazine.

In 2007–2008, as U.S. attorney, Acosta approved a plea deal that allowed child-trafficking ring-leader Jeffrey Epstein to plead guilty to a single state charge of solicitation, in exchange for a federal non-prosecution agreement. After Epstein's arrest in July 2019 on sex trafficking charges, Acosta faced renewed and harsher criticism for his role in the 2008 non-prosecution agreement, as well as criticism and calls for his resignation; he resigned on July 19 and was replaced by Eugene Scalia.

Background 
Acosta is the only son of Cuban immigrants. He is a native of Miami, Florida, where he attended the Gulliver Schools. Acosta received a Bachelor of Arts degree in economics from Harvard College in 1990, and received a Juris Doctor degree cum laude from Harvard Law School 1994. He is the first member of his family to graduate from college.

Early career

Following law school, Acosta served as a law clerk to Samuel Alito, then a judge on the United States Court of Appeals for the Third Circuit, from 1994 to 1995. Acosta then worked at the office of the law firm Kirkland & Ellis in Washington, D.C., where he specialized in employment and labor issues. While in Washington, Acosta taught classes on employment law, disability-based discrimination law, and civil rights law at the George Mason University School of Law.

On December 31, 2013, Acosta became the new chairman of U.S. Century Bank, the largest domestically owned Hispanic community bank in Florida and one of the 15 largest Hispanic community banks in the country. During his tenure as chairman, U.S. Century Bank had its first year-end profit since the start of the Great Recession. Acosta was a member of the Board of Trustees of Gulliver Schools, where he served a past term as board chairman.

George W. Bush administration 
Acosta served in four presidentially appointed, U.S. Senate-confirmed positions in the George W. Bush administration. From December 2001 to December 2002, he served as Principal Deputy Assistant Attorney General in the Civil Rights Division of the U.S. Department of Justice. From December 2002 to August 2003, he was a member of the National Labor Relations Board for which he participated in or authored more than 125 opinions.

Then, he became Assistant Attorney General for the Civil Rights Division on August 22, 2003, where he was known for increasing federal prosecutions against human trafficking. Acosta authorized federal intervention in an Oklahoma religious liberties case to help assure the right to wear hijab in public school, and worked with Mississippi authorities to reopen the investigation of the 1955 murder of Emmett Till, a 14-year-old black youth whose abduction and murder helped spark the civil rights movement. He was the first Hispanic to serve as Assistant Attorney General.

While leading the Civil Rights division, Acosta allowed his predecessor, Bradley Schlozman, to continue to make decisions on hiring. A report by the inspector general and the Office of Professional Responsibility later found that Schlozman illegally gave preferential treatment to conservatives and made false statements to the Senate Judiciary Committee. Those findings were relayed to the office of the United States attorney for the District of Columbia, but Schlozman was not prosecuted. While it put the primary responsibility on Schlozman, the report also concluded that Acosta "did not sufficiently supervise Schlozman" and that "in light of indications [he and Principal Deputy Assistant Attorney General Sheldon Bradshaw] had about Schlozman's conduct and judgment, they failed to ensure that Schlozman's hiring and personnel decisions were based on proper considerations."

U.S. attorney for Southern District of Florida 
In 2005, Acosta was appointed as the U.S. attorney for Southern District of Florida, where his office successfully prosecuted the lobbyist Jack Abramoff, the terrorism suspect José Padilla, the founders of the Cali Cartel, and Charles McArther Emmanuel, the son of Liberia's former leader.

The district also targeted white collar crime, prosecuting several bank-related cases, including one against Swiss bank UBS. The case resulted in UBS paying $780 million in fines, and for the first time in history, the bank provided the United States with the names of individuals who were using secret Swiss bank accounts to avoid U.S. federal income taxes.

Other notable cases during his tenure include the corruption prosecution of Palm Beach County Commission chairman Tony Masilotti, Palm Beach County commissioner Warren Newell, Palm Beach County commissioner Mary McCarty, and Broward sheriff Ken Jenne; the conviction of Cali Cartel founders Miguel and Gilberto Rodríguez Orejuela, for the importation of 200,000 kilos of cocaine, which resulted in a $2.1 billion forfeiture; and the white-collar crime prosecutions of executives connected to Hamilton Bank.

Acosta also emphasized health care fraud prosecutions. Under Acosta's leadership the district prosecuted more than 700 individuals, responsible for a total of more than $2 billion in Medicare fraud.

Jeffrey Epstein case 
In 2008, U.S. attorney Acosta approved a federal non-prosecution agreement with Jeffrey Epstein. That secret agreement, conducted without consulting the victims, was later ruled illegal by a federal judge for violating the Crime Victims' Rights Act.

Background

Epstein, ostensibly a wealthy hedge fund manager, was known to have a number of highly influential connections, including British Royal Prince Andrew, Harvard law professor Alan Dershowitz, former U.S. president Bill Clinton, future president Donald Trump, Tom Barrack, Leon Black, and Wilbur Ross, among others.

In March 2005, the Palm Beach Police Department received reports that Epstein had been engaged in sexually-inappropriate behavior with a minor. Police began a 13-month undercover investigation of Epstein, including a search of his home. The police search of Epstein's home found two hidden cameras and large numbers of photos of girls throughout the house, some of whom the police had interviewed in the course of their investigation. Details from the investigation included allegations that 12-year-old triplets were flown in from France for Epstein's birthday, to be sexually abused by the financier.

After the Palm Beach Chief of Police requested assistance from the Federal Bureau of Investigation (FBI), agents identified at least "34 confirmed minors" whose allegations of sexual abuse by Epstein included corroborating details. The FBI investigation resulted in a 53-page indictment in June 2007.

Non-prosecution agreement
Acosta, then the U.S. Attorney for the Southern District of Florida, agreed to a plea deal, to grant immunity from all federal criminal charges to Epstein, along with four named co-conspirators and any unnamed "potential co-conspirators". That agreement "essentially shut down an ongoing FBI probe into whether there were more victims and other powerful people who took part in Epstein's sex crimes". At the time, this halted the investigation and sealed the indictment.

The Miami Herald reported: "Acosta agreed, despite a federal law to the contrary, that the deal would be kept from the victims." The plea deal was later described as a "sweetheart deal". Epstein would go on to serve only 13 months in a private wing of the county jail, permitted to leave for 12 hours a day as 'work release'.

Acosta has variously stated that he was not directly involved in the unusual agreement, that prosecutors determined it to be the best available solution, and that he "was unduly pressured by Epstein's heavy-hitting lawyers." He also has argued the prosecution team believed conviction by trial in federal court was unlikely, and an agreement would therefore be the best way to put an end to Epstein's exploitation of underage girls.

According to the Miami Herald, Acosta took the unusual step of meeting with Epstein's attorney at a hotel 70 miles from the U.S. Attorney's office in Miami, and it was Acosta who finalized the agreement. According to the article: "In email after email, Acosta... acquiesced to Epstein's legal team's demands, which often focused on ways to limit the scandal by shutting out his victims and the media, including suggesting that the charges be filed in Miami, instead of Palm Beach, where Epstein's victims lived."

According to a source in a Daily Beast article, Acosta informed the Trump presidential transition team that he offered a lenient plea deal because he was told that Epstein "belonged to intelligence", was "above his pay grade," and to "leave it alone".

Responses
The federal agreement and Epstein's subsequent lenient treatment while incarcerated by the State of Florida have been the subject of criticism, with the Miami Herald calling the agreement "the deal of a lifetime." The fact that the agreement with Epstein also protected unnamed "potential co-conspirators" from federal prosecution drew speculation that perhaps the deal was intended to protect influential people in Epstein's orbit. However, others have described that clause as intended to protect those of Epstein's victims who had been enticed to help him recruit other victims for abuse.

A federal judge later found that the prosecutors had violated the victims' rights in that they had concealed the agreement from the victims and instead urged them to have "patience".

The federal agreement with Epstein was not a typical criminal law plea bargain, but instead employed a structure commonly used in regulatory settlements with corporations. In an op-ed, the approach was described by a member of the prosecution team as a method to address the state of Florida's prior decision not to bring felony charges against Epstein for the same activities.

Jeffrey Sloman, one of the prosecutors in the case, defended the agreement in a February 2019 op-ed piece in the Miami Herald: "Our priorities were to make sure Epstein could not hurt anyone else and to compensate Epstein's victims without retraumatizing them. Our team worked diligently to build a federal case against Epstein. Throughout the investigation, we took care to be respectful of the pain Epstein's victims had endured. As we continued, however, it became clear that most of Epstein's victims were terrified to cooperate against him. Some hired lawyers to avoid appearing before a grand jury. One of the key witnesses moved to Australia and refused to return calls from us. We also researched and discussed significant legal impediments to prosecuting [in federal court] what was, at heart, a local sex abuse case. Given the obstacles we faced in fashioning a robust federal prosecution, we decided to negotiate a resolution.... You can disagree with the result we reached, but our whole team — from Alex [Acosta] on down the chain of command — always acted with integrity and in good faith."

Renewed interest
In 2017, Acosta was nominated for Secretary of Labor. His handling of the Epstein case was discussed as part of his confirmation hearing.

On November 28, 2018, as rumors circulated that Acosta was being considered as a possible successor to Attorney General Jeff Sessions, the Miami Herald published an investigation detailing Acosta's role in the Epstein case. That story revealed the extent of collaboration between federal prosecutors and Epstein's attorneys in their efforts to keep victims from learning of the plea deal.

The Miami Herald describes an email from Epstein's attorney after his off-site meeting with Acosta: "'Thank you for the commitment you made to me during our Oct. 12 meeting,' Lefkowitz wrote in a letter to Acosta after their breakfast meeting in West Palm Beach. He added that he was hopeful that Acosta would abide by a promise to keep the deal confidential. 'You ... assured me that your office would not ... contact any of the identified individuals, potential witnesses or potential civil claimants and the respective counsel in this matter,' Lefkowitz wrote."

The Miami Herald article contended that certain aspects of Acosta's non-prosecution agreement violated federal law. "As part of the arrangement, Acosta agreed, despite a federal law to the contrary, that the deal would be kept from the victims. As a result, the non-prosecution agreement was sealed until after it was approved by the judge, thereby averting any chance that the girls — or anyone else — might show up in court and try to derail it." Victims, former prosecutors, and the retired Palm Beach police chief were among those quoted criticizing the agreement and Acosta's role in it.

Victims' rights violation
After a lawsuit was filed in federal court, in 2019, a court ruled that the non-prosecution agreement was invalid and that prosecutors had violated the victim's rights with their non-prosecution agreement.

On February 21, 2019, a ruling in federal court returned Acosta's role in the Epstein case to the headlines. The decision to keep the deal with Epstein secret until after it was finalized was found to be a violation of the Crime Victims' Rights Act of 2004 (CVRA), which requires notifying victims of the progress of federal criminal cases. The CVRA was new and relatively untested at the time of the Epstein non-prosecution agreement. In 2008, representatives for two of Epstein's victims filed a lawsuit in federal court aiming to vacate the federal non-prosecution agreement on the grounds that it violated the CVRA. For more than a decade, the U.S. Attorney's office denied that it acted in violation of victims' rights laws and argued that the CVRA did not apply in the Epstein case. The government's contention that the CVRA did not apply was based on questions of timing (whether or not CVRA applied prior to filing of federal charges), relevance (whether the CVRA applied to non-prosecution agreements), and jurisdiction (whether the case should be considered a federal case or a state case under the CVRA). The court rejected those arguments in the February 21, 2019 ruling, finding that the CVRA did in fact apply and that victims should have been notified of the Epstein non-prosecution agreement in advance of its signing, to afford them the opportunity to influence its terms. At the conclusion of his ruling, the federal judge in the case noted that he was "not ruling that the decision not to prosecute was improper," but was "simply ruling that, under the facts of this case, there was a violation of the victims rights [for reasonable, accurate, and timely notice] under the CVRA."

Because the CVRA does not specify penalties for failure to meet victims notification requirements, the judge offered both parties opportunities to suggest remedies—Epstein's victims who were party to the suit asked for rescission of the federal non-prosecution agreement with Epstein, while the government suggested other approaches, maintaining that other victims were against rescinding the agreement due to privacy concerns and possible impacts to restitution paid under the agreement.
Following the Herald investigation and related news coverage, members of Congress submitted a formal request to the U.S. Department of Justice for review of Acosta's role in the Epstein deal, and several editorials called for Acosta's resignation or termination from his then-current position as U.S. Labor Secretary. In February 2019, the Justice Department's Office of Professional Responsibility notified Senator Ben Sasse that it had opened an investigation into Epstein's prosecution.

Epstein's arrest and Acosta's resignation

On July 6, 2019, Epstein was arrested by the FBI-NYPD Crimes Against Children Task Force on sex trafficking charges stemming from activities alleged to have occurred in 2002–2005. The search of his townhouse turned up evidence of sex trafficking and also found "hundreds – and perhaps thousands – of sexually suggestive photographs of fully – or partially – nude females". Some of the photos were confirmed as those of underage females. In a locked safe, compact discs were found with handwritten labels including the descriptions: "Young [Name] + [Name]", "Misc nudes 1", and "Girl pics nude".

Amid criticism of his mishandling of the Epstein case, Acosta resigned his role as Secretary of Labor effective July 19, 2019, after a public outcry. 

Epstein was found dead in his cell at the Metropolitan Correctional Center on August 10, 2019.

According to an internal review conducted by the Department of Justice's Office of Professional Responsibility, which was released in November 2020, Acosta showed "poor judgment" in granting Epstein a non-prosecution agreement and failing to notify Epstein's alleged victims about this agreement.

Law school dean 
On July 1, 2009, Acosta became the second dean of Florida International University College of Law. He spearheaded the effort to establish the Master of Studies in Law in banking compliance, Bank Secrecy Act and anti-money-laundering at FIU Law.

Secretary of Labor

Nomination and confirmation 

President Donald Trump announced in a press conference on February 16, 2017, that he would nominate Acosta to fill the position of Secretary of Labor after the nomination of Andrew Puzder was withdrawn. Acosta was recommended by White House counsel Don McGahn. Acosta is the first, and –  – the only Hispanic person to serve in Trump's cabinet.

The Senate Committee on Health, Education, Labor and Pensions held confirmation hearings on March 22, 2017, and Acosta's nomination was reported out of the committee on March 30, 2017.

On April 27, 2017, Acosta was confirmed as Secretary of Labor by the U.S. Senate in a 60–38 vote. He received the support of eight Democratic Senators and all Republican senators except Senator Pat Toomey, who did not participate in the vote. On April 28, 2017, Acosta was sworn in by Vice President Mike Pence.

Tenure 
In 2019, Acosta proposed cutting the funding of his department's International Labor Affairs Bureau from $68 million in 2018 to under $20 million in 2020. That agency combats human trafficking (including child sex trafficking), child labor and forced labor internationally.

During Acosta's confirmation hearing, he discussed the need and his support of apprenticeship as a workforce development tool to close the skills gap. On June 15, 2017, President Trump signed Executive Order 13801, "Presidential Executive Order Expanding Apprenticeships in America," establishing the Task Force on Apprenticeship Expansion with Acosta serving as the chair. The task force held five public meetings and issued their final report to President Trump on May 10, 2018.

Following the task force final report, the U.S. Department of Labor announced the following initiatives to expand and promote apprenticeship opportunities:
 Create a new industry-recognized apprenticeship program system to complement the registered apprenticeship system.
 Launch Apprenticeship.gov as a "one-stop source for all things apprenticeship."

Acosta announced that the Trump administration maintained a goal of one million new apprentices.

Acosta resigned as Labor Secretary, effective July 19, 2019, following criticism of his role in the Epstein case.

Recognition 
Acosta has twice been named one of the nation's 50 most influential Hispanics by Hispanic Business Magazine. He serves or served on the Florida Innocence Commission, on the Florida Supreme Court's Commission on Professionalism, Florida Supreme Court's Access to Justice Commission, and on the Commission for Hispanic Rights and Responsibilities. In 2008, Acosta was named as one of the 100 most influential people in business ethics by the Ethisphere Institute.

References

External links 

 Official biography from the U.S. Department of Labor (archive)
 Assistant Attorney General R. Alexander Acosta
 Secretary Acosta on Twitter
 

|-

|-

|-

|-

|-

20th-century American lawyers
21st-century American lawyers
1969 births
American politicians of Cuban descent
Federalist Society members
Florida International University people
Florida lawyers
Florida Republicans
George W. Bush administration personnel
Harvard College alumni
Harvard Law School alumni
Hispanic and Latino American members of the Cabinet of the United States
Jeffrey Epstein
People associated with Kirkland & Ellis
Lawyers from Miami
Living people
National Labor Relations Board officials
Trump administration cabinet members
United States Assistant Attorneys General for the Civil Rights Division
United States Attorneys for the Southern District of Florida
United States Secretaries of Labor
Gulliver Preparatory School alumni
Latino conservatism in the United States